Market Street Historic District is a historic district located at Corning in Steuben County, New York.

It was originally listed on the National Register of Historic Places in 1974 and its boundaries were increased in 2000.

References

External links

Historic districts on the National Register of Historic Places in New York (state)
Historic districts in Steuben County, New York
Corning, New York
National Register of Historic Places in Steuben County, New York